Judge Haines may refer to:

Harry Haines (born 1939), judge of the United States Tax Court
Stephanie L. Haines (born 1969), judge of the United States District Court for the Western District of Pennsylvania

See also
Justice Haines (disambiguation)